Arthur Charles Innes (1834–1902), was an Irish Conservative Party Member of the Parliament of the United Kingdom who represented the constituency of Newry from 1865 to 1868.

References

External links 
 

1834 births
1902 deaths
Irish Conservative Party MPs
Place of birth missing
Members of the Parliament of the United Kingdom for Newry (1801–1918)
UK MPs 1865–1868